The North Geelong Football Netball Club Inc is an Australian rules football and netball club located in Geelong.

History
The club was established in 1876, and is currently in the Geelong & District Football League. The club's colours are black and white, with a magpie as their logo. Their home shorts are black with black socks. They have won a total of 17 senior premierships, 11 reserves premierships and 7 U18s premierships. Their home ground is Osborne Park in Swinbourne Street, North Geelong.

The club dominated the league in the 1950s, winning seven premierships in a row and eight premierships in ten years between 1949–1958. In 1959, the club considered joining the Victorian Football Association, which was expanding at the time, and the club approached the VFA to enquire about minimum home ground requirements and the like; but it never ultimately joined.

North Geelong also fielded a women's team in  Division 1 of the Victorian Women's Football League (2015), before being elevated to the VFL Women's competition in 2016, playing as the Geelong Magpies. In 2017, after the Geelong Cats took the license for the VFLW team, North Geelong Women's team joined the AFL Goldfields Women's Football League, going through the 2017 season undefeated on the way to beating Redan in the Grand Final.

Premierships

 Geelong & District Football League 
Seniors — 1925, 1930, 1949, 1950, 1951, 1952, 1953, 1954, 1955, 1958, 1968, 1969, 1988, 1990, 1992, 1993, 2002, 2013

Reserves — 1949, 1955, 1956, 1957, 1958, 1959, 1963, 1988, 1996, 1997, 2002, 2013, 2014, 2015, 2016

Under 18's — 1939, 1944, 1949, 1952, 1996, 1997, 2005, 2006, 2009, 2010, 2011, 2014
 AFL Goldfields Women's
Seniors — 2017
 AFL Barwon Women's Football
Division 1 — 2018 
Division 2 — 2019

VFL/AFL

Tom Arklay
Max Atkin
Lionel Barclay
Andrew Bews
Leo Dean
Marc Dragicevic
Billy Gallagher (footballer)
Bill Goggin
Ken Hands
Gordon Hynes (footballer)
Doug Jerram
Kevin Kirkpatrick
Harold Manson
Dale Mather
Tom Morrow (footballer)
Jack Mullane
Angie Muller
Jack Muller (footballer)
Nick Muller
Don O'Hara
Alex Perry (Australian footballer)
Ray Sarcevic
Wally Southern
Jack Stevens (Australian footballer)
Vic Taylor (footballer)
Neil Tompkins
Len Vautier
Rod West

Bibliography
 Cat Country: History of Football In The Geelong Region by John Stoward –

References

External links
 Official website

Geelong Football League clubs
1876 establishments in Australia
Australian rules football clubs established in 1876
Sports clubs established in 1876
Geelong & District Football League clubs
Netball teams in Geelong
Australian rules football clubs in Geelong